Maoraxidae is an extinct family of snails, gastropod molluscs in the clade Sorbeoconcha.

According to the taxonomy of the Gastropoda by Bouchet & Rocroi (2005) the family Maoraxidae has no subfamilies.

Genera 
 † Maoraxis Bandel, Gründel, Maxwell, 2000 - type genus
 † Maoraxis kieli Bandel, Gründel, Maxwell, 2000

References